Stilfontein (Afrikaans for quiet spring) is a former mining town which is located on the N12 (National Road) with 17,942 inhabitants, situated between Klerksdorp and Potchefstroom in North West Province of South Africa. Khuma is situated 11,3 kilometres from the town. It was incorporated into the City of Matlosana and some municipality administration is located in Matlosana (Klerksdorp).

History
Stilfontein was established in 1949 as a residential centre for three large gold mines: the Hartebeesfontein, Buffelsfontein, and Stilfontein mines.

In May 1949, two shafts (Charles and Margaret) were sunk and it was this success at Stilfontein that inspired the opening up of the Hartebeesfontein and Buffelsfontein mines.

The Margaret shaft at the Stilfontein mine was the first concrete headgear ever to be erected in South Africa and was designed locally and completely constructed form local materials. Tower mounted on this headgear was the first ever multi rope Koepoe hoist in South Africa.

Demographics 
According to the 2011 Census, the population of Stilfontein was 17,942. The population density was 1,717 persons per km² (663 persons per mi²).

Tourist attractions 
Hartebeesfontein Gold Mine
Annual Rose Festival in spring
Matlosana Mall 
Ngwenya Hotel & Conference

Earthquakes
Stilfontein was struck by a mining-related earthquake on 9 March 2005, which damaged buildings in the town, which was followed by the closure of the Hartebeesfontein and Buffelsfontein mines when the Stilfontein Gold Mining was handed over into liquidation. The Simmer and Jack Mines took over the mines but disaster struck again on 23 March 2006 when a fire trapped 8 miners underground at the Buffelsfontein mine.

Politics
Current Freedom Front Plus (FF+) Leader Pieter Groenewald started his political career in this town by being elected mayor in 1988. Groenewald was soon elected to represent the constituency in the then House of Assembly of South Africa for the Conservative Party in 1989.

Following the 1994 general elections, the town became a traditional stronghold for the Democratic Alliance (DA) with the party performing better than 60% in each of the general and municipal elections. Stilfontein is part of the Matlosana Local Municipality.

In the 2019 general elections, the FF+ significantly made inroads in this community with the party narrowly achieving a plurality of the votes on the provincial ballot. The DA achieved a narrow plurality of the national votes.

On 10 July 2019, a municipal by-election was held in the town as a result of the resignation of a DA councillor. The FF+ candidate Stephanus Petrus Kloppers won the ward with 56.51% of the vote, a gain of 32.84%. Kloppers is the first FF+ ward councillor in South Africa.

References 

Populated places in the City of Matlosana Local Municipality
Populated places established in 1949
Mining communities in South Africa